Highland Park–Overlee Knolls, also known as Fostoria, is a national historic district located in Arlington County, Virginia. It is directly east of the Virginia Heights Historic District.  It contains 681 contributing buildings, 3 contributing sites, and 1 contributing structure in a residential neighborhood in North Arlington. The first subdivision was platted in 1890 and known as Fostoria.

The company, which was seen in advertisements as Fostoria Land and Improvement Company, was incorporated in November 1890. William E. Abbott served as president, with James M. Hoge as secretary, and Madison A. Ballinger acting as the real estate broker. Madison Adams Ballinger (born 1848) was active in Washington, D.C., society. His house was decorated in red, white and blue, in honor of the Daughters of the American Revolution of which his wife, Francis Marion "Minnie" Fazio (born 1849) was the President of the Continental Chapter. His daughter, Miriam Nina C. Ballinger (1876-1968) married Francois Wilhelm Hiddinga (born July 25, 1868) in 1905.

Later subdivisions of Fostoria were platted including Over-Lee Knolls (1926), Section Two Over-Lee Knolls (1927), Richmond Hill Section Three (1946), Richmond Hill Section Four (1947) and Highland Park Village (1947).  It primarily consists of single family dwellings in a number of popular architectural styles including Queen Anne, Italianate, Colonial Revival, Craftsman, Tudor Revival, and Modern-style. Also located in the district is Parkhurst Park (1939). The houses were built by multiple developers and speculative builders.

It was listed on the National Register of Historic Places in 2011.

References

Houses on the National Register of Historic Places in Virginia
Queen Anne architecture in Virginia
Italianate architecture in Virginia
Colonial Revival architecture in Virginia
Tudor Revival architecture in Virginia
Historic districts on the National Register of Historic Places in Virginia
National Register of Historic Places in Arlington County, Virginia
Houses in Arlington County, Virginia